Liam Coen (born November 8, 1985) is an American football coach who is the offensive coordinator and quarterbacks coach for the University of Kentucky. He had also served in that role in the 2021 season.  Coen was the offensive coordinator in 2022 for the Los Angeles Rams of the National Football League (NFL). Before that, Coen served as an assistant coach at the University of Maine, UMass, University of Rhode Island, and Brown University.

Early life and playing career
Born in Warwick, Rhode Island and raised in Newport, Rhode Island, Coen played for his father, Tim, at La Salle Academy in Providence where he was named Rhode Island's Gatorade Player of the Year. Coen also played quarterback at UMass from 2004 to 2008 where he was a four-year starter, wearing the jersey number 12 in honor of his favorite athlete, Tom Brady; he was roommates with former NFL wide receiver Victor Cruz. As of February 2019, Coen holds six of the eight UMass career passing records, the other two being career interceptions and career yards per game average. In 2022, he was inducted into UMass Athletics Hall of Fame.

Coaching career

Early coaching career
After his playing career ended, he worked at Brown as their quarterbacks coach in 2010 as well as 2012 to 2013. He spent 2011 with Rhode Island as their pass game coordinator & quarterbacks coach. He then moved on to his alma mater UMass in 2014 as their pass game coordinator and quarterbacks coach. He was then hired by Maine as their offensive coordinator in 2016, incorporating schemes he learned at UMass from Mark Whipple.

He initially accepted a position at Holy Cross in 2018 as their offensive coordinator before accepting a position with the Los Angeles Rams.

Los Angeles Rams
Coen was hired to be the assistant wide receivers coach for the Rams in 2018. He was reassigned to assistant quarterbacks coach in 2020.

Kentucky
Coen was named the offensive coordinator and quarterbacks coach at Kentucky on December 15, 2020. In Coen's unofficial interview with Kentucky head coach Mark Stoops, he presented a detailed plan of schedules and responsibilities as well as a video compilation of 300 offensive plays he thought he could implement from his time with the Rams. Coen helped the Wildcats to a 10-3 record, including a 20-17 victory over Iowa in the 2022 Citrus Bowl.

Los Angeles Rams (second stint)
On February 21, 2022, Coen was hired by the Los Angeles Rams as their offensive coordinator, replacing Kevin O'Connell, following his departure to become the head coach of the Minnesota Vikings.

Kentucky (second stint)
Coen returned to his previous role as the offensive coordinator and quarterbacks coach at Kentucky on January 10, 2023.

References

External links
Los Angeles Rams profile
University of Kentucky profile
UMass Minutemen profile

1985 births
Living people
Alabama Vipers players
American football quarterbacks
Brown Bears football coaches
Kentucky Wildcats football coaches
La Salle Academy alumni
Los Angeles Rams coaches
Maine Black Bears football coaches
National Football League offensive coordinators
People from Newport, Rhode Island
People from Warwick, Rhode Island
Players of American football from Rhode Island
Rhode Island Rams football coaches
UMass Minutemen football coaches
UMass Minutemen football players